Biel is both a surname and a given name. Notable people with the name include:

Surname
Julia Biel (born 1976), jazz singer and composer
Jessica Biel (born 1982), American actress
Gabriel Biel (c. 1420 or 1425–1495), German philosopher
Tito Biel, South Sudanese politician and major general
Ulrich Biel (1907–1996), German politician (CDU)

Given name
Biel Medina (born 1980), Spanish footballer
Biel Ribas (born 1985), Spanish footballer

See also
Biehl, surname

German-language surnames
Surnames from nicknames